Eugene St. Rose Reynal (March 31, 1902 – March 20, 1968) was an American publisher who founded Blue Ribbon Books of Garden City, New York, and Reynal & Hitchcock (with Curtice Hitchcock) of New York City in 1933.

From 1938 to 1946, Reynal was married to Elizabeth Young, an actress who had appeared in Queen Christina with Greta Garbo. During World War II, Reynal served as a Captain in the Army Air Forces, stationed at one point in Miami Beach, Florida.

Louis Menand in The New Yorker wrote of Reynal that he "achieved immortality the bad way" by turning down the opportunity to publish The Catcher in the Rye.

References

1902 births
1968 deaths
People from Manhattan
American book publishers (people)
United States Army Air Forces personnel of World War II